Youssef Boulaouali (born 26 December 1992) is a Moroccan footballer who plays for Dessel Sport as a winger.

Club career
Youssef Boulaouali started his career with R. Cappellen F.C.

External links
 

1992 births
Living people
Moroccan footballers
Moroccan expatriate footballers
Challenger Pro League players
Royal Cappellen F.C. players
K Beerschot VA players
Lierse Kempenzonen players
K.F.C. Dessel Sport players
Association football wingers
Moroccan expatriate sportspeople in Belgium
Expatriate footballers in Belgium
People from Nador